The Treaty of London in  1518 was a non-aggression pact between the major European states. The signatories were Burgundy, France, England, the Holy Roman Empire, the Netherlands, the Papal States and Spain, all of whom agreed not to attack one another and to come to the aid of any that were under attack.

The treaty was designed by Cardinal Wolsey and so came to be signed by the ambassadors of the nations concerned in London. Pope Leo X originally called for a five-year peace while the monarchs of Europe helped him fight back the rising power of the Ottoman Empire, which was encroaching into the Balkans. Wolsey was very keen on instead making lasting peace and persuaded Henry VIII to avoid war and to take a more diplomatic route in foreign affairs.

Background

In the 15th century, peace was established for 50 years in the Italian Peninsula, which was divided into many small city-states. Only the small War of Ferrara between the Republic of Venice and the Papal States for the control of Ferrara caused a temporary lapse in the peace.

The mostly-peaceful period came to an end with the French invasion of 1494. A succession of small wars followed, and in 1518, the political possibilities of a peace treaty seemed a realisation.

Terms

All European countries were invited to London (the Grand Duchy of Moscow and the Ottoman Empire were considered to be in Asia, not Europe). The treaty hoped to bind the 20 leading states of Europe into peace with one another and thus end warfare between the states of Europe.

In October 1518, the Treaty was initiated between representatives from England and France. It was then ratified by other European states and the Pope. The agreement established a defensive league based upon certain terms. The central tenet was that states with an active foreign policy needed to commit to a stance of non-aggression. As a corollary tenet, signatory states also needed to promise to make war collectively upon any state that broke the terms of the treaty.

At the time, the Treaty was considered a triumph for Thomas Wolsey. It allowed Henry VIII to increase his standing so greatly in European political circles that England became seen as a third major power, albeit still well behind the Holy Roman Empire and France.

Legacy 
The peace the treaty brought was very brief. Wars broke out in a few years, including wars between Denmark and Sweden and also an alliance of England and Spain against France. The peace movement, however, continued for next centuries and became part of the Enlightenment movement in the 18th century.

See also
List of treaties
Treaties of London
George of Poděbrady for an earlier proposal of similar nature

References

London
Treaties of England
London
1518 in Europe
16th century in London
Treaties of the Kingdom of France
Treaties of the Spanish Empire
Treaties of the Burgundian Netherlands
Non-aggression pacts
1518 in England
1518 treaties